Harry Moore may refer to:

Politicians
 A. Harry Moore (1879–1952), U.S. Senator and 39th Governor of New Jersey
 Harry Andrew Moore (1914–1998), Canadian politician
 Harry Moore (Australian politician) (1924–2009), Australian Labor Party politician

Sports
 Henry W. Moore (1876–1917), Negro league baseball player, known as Harry
 Harry Moore (footballer, born 1861) (1861–1939), England international footballer
 Harry Moore (Australian footballer) (1928–1989), played with South Melbourne in VFL

Others
 Harry Charles Moore (1941–1997), American murderer executed in Oregon
 Harry Wilkinson Moore (1850–1915), British architect
 Harry T. Moore (1905–1951), African-American civil rights activist
 Harry Humphrey Moore (1844–1926), American painter

See also
 Henry Moore (disambiguation)
 Harold Moore (disambiguation)
 Harrison Moore (1867–1935), Australian lawyer and academic